The 54th Massachusetts General Court, consisting of the Massachusetts Senate and the Massachusetts House of Representatives, met in 1833 during the governorship of Levi Lincoln Jr. Benjamin T. Pickman served as president of the Senate and William B. Calhoun served as speaker of the House.

Senators

Representatives

See also
 22nd United States Congress
 List of Massachusetts General Courts

References

Further reading

External links
 
 

Political history of Massachusetts
Massachusetts legislative sessions
massachusetts
1833 in Massachusetts